State violence is defined as "the use of legitimate governmental authority to cause unnecessary harm and suffering to groups, individuals, and states". It can be defined broadly or narrowly to refer to such events as genocide, state terrorism, drone attacks, police brutality, state surveillance, or juridical violence.

References

Further reading

Violence
Human rights abuses